Starz Entertainment LLC., (doing business as Starz Inc., and founded as Encore Movie Group in 1991) is an American entertainment company that owns U.S. pay television channels, including the namesake Starz network, and a media distribution company. The company is headquartered at Meridian, Colorado, and uses nearby Englewood as its location in corporate filings and press releases. On December 8, 2016, it became a subsidiary of Lionsgate.

History

Early history
Encore Movie Group (also known as Encore Media Group) was founded in 1991 as a wholly owned television programming subsidiary and a joint venture of Liberty Media and Tele-Communications Inc., two companies that were controlled by John C. Malone. The premium channel Encore was launched in 1991 on cable systems operated by Tele-Communications Inc., followed by the launch of Starz in 1994, and Encore Plex (now MoviePlex) in 1997.

On June 2, 1997, TCI announced it would transfer part of its ownership stake in Encore Media Group to sister company Liberty Media, due in part to substantial losses incurred by the Starz network. TCI retained a minority 20% ownership interest in Encore Media Group until Liberty Media acquired TCI's stake following its 1999 merger with AT&T Corporation.

In 1999, Encore Media Group was renamed the Starz Encore Media Group, "Media" was dropped off in 2001. As part of a corporate restructuring in 2003, Starz Encore Group eliminated 100 jobs in its nine regional offices, four of which have been closed. On March 25, 2005, Starz Encore Group was renamed Starz Entertainment, and on March 28, Starz! was renamed Starz (dropping the exclamation point) and adopted a new logo featuring a hand-drawn star and a wordmark set in Helvetica Neue Black.

Starz Media
On August 31, 2006, Liberty Media acquired the US division of IDT Entertainment for $186 million, followed by the Canadian and Australian divisions on September 29, 2006. IDT Entertainment was then merged under Starz Entertainment Group and renamed Starz Media.

On November 19, 2009, Liberty Media spun off Starz Entertainment Group into a separate tracking stock, known as Liberty Starz. On January 1, 2010, Chris Albrecht became the president and CEO of Liberty Starz, overseeing the company's entities including Starz Entertainment, Overture Films, Anchor Bay Entertainment and Film Roman.

On January 4, 2011, The Weinstein Company acquired 25% of Starz Media, one of the operating units of Liberty Starz. The arrangement included a five-year distribution deal under which starting in April 2011, Liberty Starz's Anchor Bay Entertainment would release new TWC films on DVD and Starz Digital Media would handle online downloads and streaming.

On August 8, 2012, Liberty Media announced that it would spin-off Liberty Starz into a separate public company; the transaction includes about $1.5 billion of debt. The spin-off of the subsidiary was expected to be completed by the end of 2012, but was actually completed on January 11, 2013. As a result of the spin-off, Liberty Starz changed its name to "Starz Inc." Starz Inc.'s businesses and assets at the time consisted of Starz Networks, Starz Distribution, and its minority stake in Arc Productions.

Acquisition by Lionsgate
On February 11, 2015, John C. Malone, the majority shareholder in both Starz and its former parent company Liberty Media, swapped a 4.5% stake with 14.5% of the voting power in Starz Inc. for 3.4% of shares in film and television entertainment company Lionsgate while joining the company's board of directors. Fourteen days later, Starz CEO Chris Albrecht hinted a possible merger with Lionsgate.

On November 10, 2015, Malone's two other companies, Liberty Global and Discovery Communications, made a joint investment of $195–400 million in Lionsgate and acquired a 3.4% stake in the company.

On June 30, 2016, Lionsgate agreed to acquire Starz Inc. for $4.4 billion in cash and stock. As part of the acquisition by Lionsgate, Starz Inc.'s home entertainment business have been subsumed into Lionsgate's Worldwide Home Entertainment division, as well as Starz Inc.'s Worldwide TV distribution group being similarly combined. On December 8, 2016, the deal was finalized thus making Starz a subsidiary of Lionsgate.

Starz Networks
Starz Networks currently consists of 17 American cable TV channels. As of December 31, 2012, Starz and Starz Encore serve a combined 56 million subscribers, including 21 million at STARZ, and 35 million at Starz Encore. Starz, Starz Encore, and MoviePlex air over 1,000 movies monthly across 17 linear networks, On Demand, and online offerings through Starz Encore Play and MoviePlex Play.

List of Starz-owned channels
 MoviePlex
 MoviePlex
 IndiePlex
 RetroPlex
 Starz
 Starz
 Starz Cinema
 Starz Comedy
 Starz Edge
 Starz in Black
 Starz Kids & Family
 Starz Encore
 Starz Encore
 Starz Encore Action
 Starz Encore Black
 Starz Encore Classic
 Starz Encore Español
 Starz Encore Family
 Starz Encore Suspense
 Starz Encore Westerns

References

External links

 
 About Us Page

Starz Entertainment Group
Lionsgate subsidiaries
Former Liberty Media subsidiaries
Cable network groups in the United States
American companies established in 1991
Entertainment companies established in 1991
Mass media companies established in 1991
Entertainment companies of the United States
Mass media companies of the United States
Companies based in Meridian, Colorado
2016 mergers and acquisitions